Belmont Academy is the largest secondary school in Ayr. The Academy is non-denominational and state-run by South Ayrshire Council. In 2008 the school transferred from the 48-year-old campus into a new building, which was opened to pupils in August 2008.

History

The original Belmont Academy was built in 1960. When the school leaving age rose to 15, Ayr Academy no longer had the capacity for all the secondary school children in Ayr and so Belmont was built. Construction of the current campus started on 10 January 2007 and the new building was opened to pupils in August 2008.

Mainholm Academy decant

In mid-2006, Mainholm Academy was closed for repairs and all of the school's pupils were decanted into neighbouring schools – namely the Belmont, Ayr and Kyle Academies. Subsequently, on 24 November 2006 it was revealed by South Ayrshire Council that Mainholm would be closed permanently and the transfer of pupils to new schools became permanent.

The public-private partnership rebuild

Belmont Academy, along with Prestwick Academy, has had a new campus built to replace their aged original buildings. South Ayrshire Council made use of the controversial public-private partnership (PPP) plan to finance the project. Construction work was contracted to the British-based company Carillion. Work was originally due to start in the summer of 2006 but was delayed and did not begin until 10 January 2007. The former playing fields beside the school were entirely fenced off during this process. Although work started later than intended the school was completed by the original date in 2008 and opened to pupils on 24 August 2008.
The gradual dismantling and demolition of the original buildings began shortly after the new facilities opened, during which time the old campus was completely sealed off from the new.  The demolition and clearing was finished by February 2009.

New Head Teacher, 2013

Early in the year, and after many years serving Belmont Academy, headteacher Alan Moir left his post. A temporary headteacher Allan Rattray of Girvan Academy occupied the role for several weeks before his replacement, Susan Beattie, was able to take up her post.

Houses
The school has 5 houses into which the pupils of the school are assigned. Originally named after islands in the Firth of Clyde, the houses were Arran, Craig, Cumbrae and Bute. As the school roll varied, first Kintyre was added to make 5 houses, then Bute was dropped as the school roll fell, however it was reinstated together with Lomond as the school roll was subsequently increased again with the partial assimilation of Mainholm Academy. In 2010 Craig house was dropped and the pupils split between the remaining 5 houses. The remaining 5 houses are Cumbrae, Bute, Lomond, Kintyre and Arran.

Current Management Structure

Head Teacher

 Mr. K Boyd (2022–present)

Depute Head Teachers

 Mr. G McLean
 Mr. S Anderson 
 Mr. A Bryden 
 Mr. B Sinclair

Former Head Teachers 
Mr D McCredie – August 1960 – June 1969 – Retired* 
Mr A Steele – August 1969 – June 1976 – Left* Died 1976
Mr W F Stewart – August 1975 – March 1997 – Retired .
Mr A Moir – March 1997 – June 2012 – Retired*
Mrs S Beattie – August 2012 – December 2016 – Retired
Mr G McLean – January 2017 to February 2017 (Acting)
Miss T Stewart – March 2017 – January 2022
Mr G McLean – January 2022 to February 2022 (Acting)

Associated Primary Schools

The current primary schools linking with Belmont are: Alloway Primary School, Kincaidston Primary School, Holmston Primary School, Tarbolton Primary School, Doonfoot Primary School and Braehead Primary School.

Notable former pupils

Notable former pupils include:

 Mike Scott from The Waterboys
 Stuart Murdoch from Belle and Sebastian
 Arnie Burgoyne from Echo and the Bunnymen
 Noam Dar professional wrestler
 Stuart Henderson Comedian from  Noel's House Party 
 David Simpson, cricketer

External links
Belmont Academy's page on Scottish Schools Online
 Belmont Academy
 About Ayr
 South Ayrshire Council

Secondary schools in South Ayrshire
Ayr
Educational institutions established in 1960
1960 establishments in Scotland